Barbarano Mossano is a comune (municipality) in the Province of Vicenza in the Italian region Veneto.

It was established on 17 February 2018 by the merger of the municipalities of Barbarano Vicentino and Mossano.

References

Cities and towns in Veneto